During the 2003–04 Spanish football season, Deportivo de La Coruña competed in La Liga.

Season summary
Deportivo reached the semi-finals of the UEFA Champions League, being knocked out by eventual champions Porto 1–0 on aggregate, Porto's goal coming from a Derlei penalty in the second leg at Estadio Riazor.

Squad
Squad at end of season

Left club during season

 (January)

Competitions

La Liga

League table

Round 6

Deportivo-Atlético Madrid 5-1

1-0 Fran  6'

1-1 Matías Lequi  11'

2-1 Enrique Romero  31'

3-1 Sergio  50'

4-1 Walter Pandiani  55'

5-1 Lionel Scaloni  90'

Copa del Rey

Round of 16

UEFA Champions League

Third qualifying round
 Deportivo La Coruña 0–0 Rosenborg
 Rosenborg 0–1 Deportivo La Coruña

Group stage

First knockout round

Quarter-final

Semi-final

References

Deportivo de La Coruna
Deportivo de La Coruña seasons